The Wacker-Arena is a multi-use stadium in Burghausen, Germany. It is currently used mostly for football matches and is the home stadium of SV Wacker Burghausen. The stadium is able to hold 10,000 people.

References

SV Wacker Burghausen
Football venues in Germany
Altötting (district)
Sports venues in Bavaria